Calkin or calkins may refer to:

 a Caulkin, part of a horseshoe

Geography
 Calkin Glacier, a glacier west of Sentinel Peak, flowing north from the Kukri Hills in Victoria Land, Antarctica

Mathematics
 In functional analysis, the Calkin algebra, named after John Wilson Calkin
 The Calkin–Wilf tree in number theory

People
 Calkin (surname)
 Calkins (surname)

Other uses
 Calkins Media, a media company based in Levittown, Pennsylvania
 C.C. Calkins, a small steamboat built in 1890 which served on Lake Washington